Frank Ernest Smith (13 May 1872 – 3 December 1943) was an English professional cricketer who played first-class cricket between 1893 and 1908. He played 68 games, and later umpired.

He was born at Bury St Edmunds in Suffolk.

As a player, Smith played for Surrey County Cricket Club as part of the County Championship winning sides of 1893 and 1895 and was awarded his county cap in 1894. His best season was in 1894 when he took 95 wickets with his "rather slow" left handed deliveries. He made 11 appearances for the short lived London County between 1901 and 1902 and played once for Transvaal in 1907, spending a number of years coaching in South Africa during the English off-season. As an umpire he stood in five Test matches between 1902 and 1910, all in South Africa.

After playing Smith coached at Sedbergh School in Yorkshire. He died at Sedbergh in 1943 aged 71.

See also 
 List of Test umpires

References

External links 
 

1872 births
1943 deaths
English cricketers
English Test cricket umpires
Surrey cricketers
London County cricketers
Gauteng cricketers
Sportspeople from Bury St Edmunds
Suffolk cricketers